José Alfredo Sánchez Barquero (born 20 May 1987), is a Costa Rican footballer who plays for Pérez Zeledón as a midfielder.

Club career
Sánchez started his career with Universidad in the second division, making his first tier debut in 2007. In 2011, he joined Herediano and played there till 2011, before returning to the club after having a short stint with Cartaginés. Sánchez had a short loan stint with Pérez Zeledón in 2014, where he scored 4 goals.

International career
On 13 October 2010, he made his international debut against El Salvador scoring a goal in the 10th minute. In 2014, after 4 years he was recalled to the team for 2014 Copa Centroamericana.

International goals

References

External links
 
 2010-13 career stats - Nación
 

1987 births
Living people
Footballers from San José, Costa Rica
Association football midfielders
Costa Rican footballers
Costa Rican expatriate footballers
C.F. Universidad de Costa Rica footballers
C.S. Herediano footballers
C.S. Cartaginés players
Municipal Pérez Zeledón footballers
C.D. Guastatoya players
Liga FPD players
Liga Nacional de Fútbol de Guatemala players
Costa Rica international footballers
Costa Rican expatriate sportspeople in Guatemala
Expatriate footballers in Guatemala